Jayson Shaw (born 13 September 1990 in Glasgow) is a Scottish pool player. In 2010, Shaw was a WPA World Blackball Champion. In 2016, Shaw won the 25th International Challenge of Champions event.

Shaw also appeared representing Europe at the Mosconi Cup, winning the event in 2016, 2017, 2020, 2021 and 2022.

On January 18, 2022, Shaw set and new world high run record in 14.1 straight pool with a score of 669.

Shaw owns his own pool room in West Haven, CT where he has now settled in the United States.

Career titles and achievements
 2023 Turning Stone Classic
 2022 Mosconi Cup
 2022 International Open 9-Ball Championship
 2022 Turning Stone Classic
 2022 Super Billiards Expo Players Championship 
 2022 14.1 Record High Run. 669 Consecutive Balls
 2021 Mosconi Cup (MVP)
 2021 Mosconi Cup
 2021 Turning Stone Classic
 2020 Mosconi Cup (MVP)
 2020 Mosconi Cup
 2020 Euro Tour Treviso Open
 2020 Derby City Classic Bigfoot 10-Ball Challenge
 2019 Great Dismal Swamp 9-Ball Classic 
 2019 Empire State 10-Ball Championship 
 2019 International Open 9-Ball Championship 
 2019 Turning Stone Classic
 2018 Ocean State 9-Ball Championship 
 2017 AZBilliards Player of the Year 
 2017 Mosconi Cup
 2017 Accu-Stats 14.1 Invitational 
 2017 U.S. Open 9-Ball Championship 
 2017 Accu-Stats 8-Ball Invitational 
 2017 Ginky Memorial Open 9-Ball 
 2017 West Coast 10 Ball Pro Challenge
 2017 Turning Stone Classic
 2017 Derby City Classic Bigfoot 10-Ball Challenge
 2016 Billiards Digest Player of the Year 
 2016 Mosconi Cup
 2016 International Challenge of Champions 
 2016 Kuwait Open 9-Ball Championship
 2016 Great Dismal Swamp 9-Ball Classic 
 2016 Steinway Classic 10-Ball 
 2016 Deurne City Classic 9-Ball 
 2016 Turning Stone Classic
 2016 Derby City Classic Bigfoot 10-Ball Challenge 
 2016 Accu-Stats 8-Ball Invitational 
 2015 Turning Stone Classic
 2015 Turning Stone Classic
 2014 Ocean State 9-Ball Championship 
 2014 Turning Stone Classic
 2013 Empire State 10-Ball Championship 
 2010 WPA World Blackball Championship

References

1988 births
Scottish pool players
Living people
Blackball players
Sportspeople from Glasgow